Corymbia flavescens, commonly known as cabbage ghost gum, bastard ghost gum, scraggy cabbage gum, or wrinkle-leaf ghost gum, is a species of tree that is endemic to northern Australia. It has smooth powdery bark, egg-shaped to lance-shaped adult leaves, flower buds in groups of three, white flowers and variably-shaped fruit. The Jaru peoples know it as warlarri.

Description
It has smooth, powdery bark that is bright white when new and is shed in thin, greyish scales. Flowering occurs from April to June, or from November to December and the flowers are white or creamy white and perfumed. Seeds are a dull to semi-glossy red or red-brown colour, limpet-shaped or oval.

Taxonomy and naming
Corymbia flavescens was first formally described in 1995 by Ken Hill and Lawrie Johnson from a specimens collected in 1925 by William Blakely and published the description in the journal Telopea. Blakely described the specimens as "a garden hybrid", but Hill and Johnson considered that there were "no characters indicating hybridism".

Distribution and habitat
Cabbage ghost gum occurs on red earth soils, often along watercourses. In Western Australia it is found in the Central Kimberley, Dampierland, Great Sandy Desert, Northern Kimberley, Ord Victoria Plain, Pilbara, Tanami and Victoria Bonaparte IBRA bioregions. In the Northern Territory it is found in the Davenport Murchison Ranges, Gulf Fall and Uplands, Mitchell Grass Downs, Mount Isa Inlier and Sturt Plateau IBRA bioregions.

Response to fire
This eucalypt regrows from a lignotuber and epicormic shoots in response to fire. As a result, the tree has a lower than 30% mortality rate even if all of its leaves are scorched during a bushfire.

See also
 List of Corymbia species

References

flavescens
Rosids of Western Australia
Myrtales of Australia
Plants described in 1995
Flora of the Northern Territory
Flora of Queensland